The 1980–81 Football League Cup was the 21st season of the Football League Cup, a knockout competition for England's top 92 football clubs. The competition started on 8 August 1980 and ended with the final replay on 1 April 1981.

The final was contested by First Division team Liverpool and Second Division West Ham United at Wembley Stadium in London and the replay was played at Villa Park in Birmingham.

First round

First Leg

Second Leg

Second round

First Leg

Second Leg

Third round

Ties

Replays

Fourth round

Ties

Replays

2nd Replay

Fifth round

Ties

Replay

Semi-finals

First Leg

Second Leg

Final

Replay

References

General

LFC History Match Report
LFC History Match Report (Replay)

Specific

EFL Cup seasons
1980–81 domestic association football cups
Lea
Cup

tr:1981 İngiltere Lig Kupası Finali